Marta Felicitas Ramirez de Galedary is a co-founder of the La Asociacion Latino Musulmana de America (LALMA) in 1999. LALMA is at the forefront of providing information and support to Latinos in Southern California. She is a former nursing director at the UMMA Clinic in Los Angeles. Galedary also works with LA Voice, and MuslimARC, (Muslim Anti-Racism Collaborative.) She is also a registered nurse.

Biography 
Marta Felicitas Ramirez was born into a ranching family in Guerrero, Mexico. She was the youngest of eleven daughters and was a student at a Catholic school. She attended the Colegio Hispano Americano in Mexico City, studying philosophy, art, psychology, and western literature. Galedary then married and had a son. She later took English lessons at a British Embassy institute before becoming an exchange student in Bath, England in 1981. There she first learned of Islam and befriended three of her Muslim classmates.

Galedary divorced her husband and moved to the United States through an exchange program. She says that she came to Islam through much soul-searching and study and embraced the religion in 1985.  In September 1999, Galedary joined four other Muslim women at the Islamic Center of Southern California in Los Angeles to start a Latina Muslim study group and Spanish language library. She has been leading Spanish-language classes for new Muslim converts. She is also a khateebah at the Women's Mosque of America.

Her conversion story is featured in "Latino Muslims: Our Journeys to Islam."

See also

 Latino Muslims
 Black Muslims
 Islam in the United States
 Latin American Muslims
 Latino American Dawah Organization

References

External links
LALMA website

Year of birth missing (living people)
Living people
People from Guerrero
Converts to Islam
American people of Mexican descent
American nonprofit executives
Nurses from California
American women nurses
People from Los Angeles
21st-century American women